Ilari Antti Sakari Filppula (born 5 November 1981) is a Finnish professional ice hockey forward currently playing for the TPS in the Finnish Liiga. He is the older brother of Valtteri Filppula.

Playing career
Filppula started his pro career in Kiekko-Vantaa, in the Finnish lower leagues, and after two years with JYP, he spent a season with Jokerit, and then returned to JYP with a two-year contract. In 2008, he signed a 2-year contract with TPS. Filppula won the Jari Kurri trophy in 2010.

On 15 June 2010, Filppula signed a one-year, two-way contract with the Detroit Red Wings. The Red Wings assigned Filppula to their AHL affiliate, the Grand Rapids Griffins, during training camp. In his first season in North America, Filppula participated in the AHL All-Star game and finished the season first on the Grand Rapids Griffins in assists and points.

Despite leading the Griffins with 64 points, Filppula was not given an opportunity in the NHL with the Red Wings and on 19 May 2011, he returned to Finland with Jokerit, signing a four-year deal. In 2013 he signed a one-year contract with HC CSKA Moscow of the Kontinental Hockey League.

At the completion of the 2013–14 season, Filppula left the KHL to sign a two-year contract with Swiss club, HC Lugano of the National League A on 8 April. 2014. In the final year of his contract in Lugano, Filppula moved in a mid-season transfer to the SHL, signing for the remainder of the 2015–16 campaign with Modo Hockey.

Unable to help Modo retain their SHL status, Filppula left the club in the off-season, signing a one-year deal to remain in the top-flight league with the Malmö Redhawks on 9 April 2016. He returned to TPS in Finnish Liiga for season 2017-18.

Career statistics

References

External links

1981 births
Living people
HC CSKA Moscow players
Finnish ice hockey centres
Grand Rapids Griffins players
Kiekko-Vantaa players
Jokerit players
JYP Jyväskylä players
HC Lugano players
Modo Hockey players
Sportspeople from Vantaa
HC TPS players
Finnish expatriate ice hockey players in Sweden
Malmö Redhawks players